Sonia Picado Sotela, (born 20 December 1936, San José, Costa Rica), is a Costa Rican jurist, politician and university professor with experience in the field of human rights.

Life
Picado has held positions in the Inter-American Commission on Human Rights, including Internal Director (1983-1984); Executive Director Attaches (1984-1987) and Executive Director (1987-1994).

At present she occupies the Presidency of the IACHR, the first woman to hold this appointment. Previously she formed part of the Inter-American Court of Human rights, in which she was a judge and, from 1988 to 1994, Vice-president. Likewise, she is member of the Managerial Council in Human Security of the United Nations, the Permanent Court of Arbitration at The Hague, and of the Inter-American Dialogue.

She has also been ambassador of Costa Rica in the United States between the 1994 to 1998 and Legislator in 1998-2002 by the National Liberation Party. From here she carried out important fights to incorporate the perspective of gender to the distinct law projects and promoted  other benefits for Costa Rican women.

She has a recognized path as defender of Human rights, especially in the promotion and fight for improving the human rights for women.

Publications 
In addition to numerous articles published at a national and international level, her opinions have been expressed in the following works: “Political Participation of Woman: A challenge yesterday, today and always” (2001), “Woman and Politics” (2002) and “Human Security and Human rights” (2003).

Awards and honours 
For her recognized path as defender of Human rights, especially in the promotion and fight for improving the human rights of women, she has been credited with three doctorates honoris cause - Elmhurts College, (2000), University of Miami, (2002) and Colby College, (2003) - and to several awards of international organisms as, among others, the Prize of Human rights of the United Nations (1993) and the Prize of the Program of the United Nations for the Development (1995).

Also, at a national level her contributions in the advance of the equality and the rights of women received the following recognitions: Recognition by the Humanitarian and Cultural Efforts (1987), the Federation of Professional Women and of Businesses of Costa Rica, Recognition by the Collaboration in Problems Related with the Women, (1986), of the Inter-American Commission of Women, and Recognition by the Professional Work with the Women, of the Organisation of Citizen Costarricenses (1986).

Likewise, the National Institute of the Women inducted her to La Galería de las Mujeres de Costa Rica (The Women's Gallery of Costa Rica) in 2005.

See also 
 Inter-American system of Human rights
 Permanent Court of Arbitration, The Hague
 National Liberation Party (Costa Rica)
 United Nations Prize in the Field of Human Rights
 Inter-American Court of Human Rights
 Inter-American Dialogue

References

External links 
 Biography of Sonia Hammered Sotela in the page of the INAMU, CR

Costa Rican women judges
1936 births
21st-century Costa Rican women politicians
21st-century Costa Rican politicians
Living people
Members of the Inter-American Dialogue
20th-century Costa Rican judges
20th-century women judges